The Province of the Transvaal, commonly referred to as the Transvaal, was a province of South Africa from 1910 until 1994, when a new constitution subdivided it following the end of apartheid. The name "Transvaal" refers to the province's geographical location to the north of the Vaal River. Its capital was Pretoria, which was also the country's executive capital.

History
In 1910, four British colonies united to form the Union of South Africa. The Transvaal Colony, which had been formed out of the bulk of the old South African Republic after the Second Boer War, became the Transvaal Province in the new union. Half a century later, in 1961, the union ceased to be part of the Commonwealth of Nations and became the Republic of South Africa. The PWV (Pretoria-Witwatersrand-Vereeniging) conurbation in the Transvaal, centred on Pretoria and Johannesburg, became South Africa's economic powerhouse, a position it still holds today as Gauteng Province.

In 1994, after the fall of apartheid, the former provinces were abolished, and the Transvaal ceased to exist. The south-central portion (including the PWV) became Gauteng, the northern portion became Limpopo and the southeastern portion became Mpumalanga. Most of the North West came from the southwestern portion of the old Transvaal, and a tiny segment of the Transvaal joined KwaZulu-Natal. 

Even before 1994, the Transvaal Province was subdivided into regions for a number of purposes (such as municipal and district courts, and sporting divisions). These divisions included Northern Transvaal (present-day Limpopo and Pretoria), Eastern Transvaal (currently Mpumalanga), Western Transvaal (currently part of North West Province) and Southern Transvaal (now Gauteng Province).

Geography 
Except on the south-west, these borders were mostly well defined by natural features.

Several Bantustans were entirely inside the Transvaal: Venda, KwaNdebele, Gazankulu, KaNgwane and Lebowa. Parts of Bophuthatswana were also in the Transvaal, with other parts in Cape Province and Orange Free State.

Within the Transvaal lies the Waterberg Massif, a prominent ancient geological feature of the South African landscape.

Regions

 PWV region (later Gauteng province) consisting of the Witwatersrand, which in turn consists of the West Rand and the East Rand, as well as Johannesburg; the Vaal Triangle and Pretoria.
 The North West
 Limpopo
 Mpumalanga

Districts in 1991

Districts of the province and population at the 1991 census. 

 Johannesburg: 1,574,631
 Alberton: 367,929
 Germiston: 171,541
 Boksburg: 195,905
 Benoni: 288,629
 Kempton Park: 354,787
 Randburg: 341,430
 Roodepoort: 219,149
 Westonaria: 160,531
 Oberholzer: 177,768
 Randfontein: 116,405
 Krugersdorp: 196,213
 Brakpan: 130,463
 Springs: 157,702
 Nigel: 92,881
 Delmas: 48,614
 Pretoria: 667,700
 Wonderboom: 266,153
 Soshanguve: 146,334
 Cullinan: 32,006
 Vanderbijlpark: 434,004
 Vereeniging: 250,511
 Heidelberg: 77,055
 Balfour: 38,311
 Standerton: 85,893
 Hoëveldrif (Highveld Ridge): 155,881
 Bethal: 77,780
 Volksrust: 29,924
 Amersfoort: 33,461
 Wakkerstroom: 33,246
 Piet Retief: 64,052
 Ermelo: 111,082
 Carolina: 30,438
 Bronkhorstspruit: 38,605
 Witbank: 173,281
 Middelburg: 140,015
 Belfast: 28,973
 Waterval-Boven: 9,300
 Groblersdal: 57,742
 Moutse (main town Dennilton): 102,179
 Nelspruit: 61,921
 Barberton: 72,165
 Witrivier: 30,235
 Pelgrimsrus (main town Sabie): 29,063
 Lydenburg: 36,976
 Letaba (main town Tzaneen): 59,900
 Phalaborwa: 30,126
 Soutpansberg (main town Louis Trichardt): 35,839
 Messina: 22,959
 Pietersburg: 64,207
 Potgietersrus: 69,571
 Waterberg (main town Nylstroom): 48,991
 Ellisras: 24,530
 Thabazimbi: 48,844
 Warmbad: 41,692
 Brits: 111,798
 Rustenburg: 125,307
 Swartruggens: 12,607
 Marico: 38,983
 Koster: 29,228
 Ventersdorp: 36,315
 Coligny: 22,154
 Lichtenburg: 79,013
 Delareyville: 36,036
 Potchefstroom: 185,552
 Klerksdorp: 321,478
 Wolmaransstad: 61,497
 Schweizer-Reneke: 46,893
 Bloemhof: 15,291
 Christiana: 13,596

Administrators

Sports
The province was divided into a number of sporting teams. These teams were renamed after the Transvaal became defunct, however their traditional territories have remained unchanged in many cases, even though they overlap the boundaries of the Transvaal's successor provinces.

Examples of this include the Blue Bulls (formerly Northern Transvaal), which governs rugby in Pretoria (now part of Gauteng) and Limpopo Province, and the Golden Lions (formerly Transvaal) formed in 1889.

The Orlando Pirates Football Club was founded in 1937 and was originally based in Orlando, Soweto and Kaizer Chiefs were founded. January 1970. Mamelodi Sundowns F.C. originated from Marabastad, a cosmopolitan area north west of the Pretoria CBD in the early 1960s.

Cricket teams from the former Transvaal include Transvaal (later Gauteng) which represented the southern parts of the province, and Northern Transvaal (later Northerns) that represents the northern parts of Gauteng, including Pretoria, as well as areas further north.

References

History of South Africa
Former provinces of South Africa
States and territories established in 1910
States and territories disestablished in 1994
1910 establishments in South Africa
1994 disestablishments in South Africa